The Royal Bafokeng Sports Palace is a football, rugby and athletics stadium in Phokeng near Rustenburg, South Africa. It was built and is managed by the Royal Bafokeng Nation. It was used as the home stadium for Premier Soccer League club Platinum Stars. The Leopards rugby team host large attendance matches during the Currie Cup at the stadium, instead of their usual home ground, Olën Park.

The capacity of the stadium was increased from 38,000 to 42,000 to be able to host five first round matches and one second round match at the 2010 FIFA World Cup.

For the 2010 tournament, the main west stand was upgraded and enlarged and given a new cantilever roof. Other improvements include the installation of new electronic scoreboards, new seats, and the upgrading of the floodlights and public address system.

The stadium upgrade was completed in March 2009 for hosting 4 matches of the 2009 FIFA Confederations Cup.

Sporting and Miscellaneous events

2009 FIFA Confederations Cup 
Royal Bafokeng Stadium was one of the host venues for the 2009 FIFA Confederations Cup.

2010 FIFA World Cup 
In the World Cup, the stadium hosted five first round matches and one second round match and was the second smallest stadium for the tournament.

Matches

2013 Africa Cup of Nations 
Royal Bafokeng Stadium served as one of the host venues for the 2013 Africa Cup of Nations.

2019 Fill Up Royal Bafokeng 
In 2019, South African star Cassper Nyovest announced that his annual one man show "Fill Up" will be heading to North West and Royal Bafokeng Stadium will be hosting his concert named Fill Up Royal Bafokeng

On the 15th of December 2019, Cassper Nyovest held his 5th concert at Royal Bafokeng with a capacity of over 40,000

See also 
List of stadiums in South Africa

References

https://www.iol.co.za/entertainment/music/local/watch-cassper-nyovest-does-it-again-with-fill-up-royal-bafokeng-39309716

External links 

Photos of Stadiums in South Africa at cafe.daum.net/stade
360 View
Official Site Link

Soccer venues in South Africa
Athletics (track and field) venues in South Africa
Rugby union stadiums in South Africa
Rugby World Cup stadiums
2009 FIFA Confederations Cup stadiums
2010 FIFA World Cup stadiums
Rustenburg
Multi-purpose stadiums in South Africa
Sports venues in North West (South African province)
Platinum Stars F.C.
1999 establishments in South Africa
Sports venues completed in 1999